Khandzk (also Khantsk) or Khanyeri is a village de facto in the Askeran Province of the breakaway Republic of Artsakh, de jure in the Khojaly District of Azerbaijan, in the disputed region of Nagorno-Karabakh.

History 
During the Soviet period, the village was a part of the Askeran District of the Nagorno-Karabakh Autonomous Oblast.

Historical heritage sites 
Historical heritage sites in and around the village include the 11th-century church of Vardapetin Khut, the 12th/13th-century shrine of Jukhtak Khach, a 13th-century village, chapel and khachkar, the 13th-century St. John's Church, St. Stephen's Church built in 1673, and a 19th-century spring monument.

Economy and culture 
The population is mainly engaged in agriculture and animal husbandry. As of 2015, the village has a municipal building, a house of culture, a school, two shops, and a medical centre.

Demographics 
The village has an ethnic Armenian-majority population, had 231 inhabitants in 2005, and 261 inhabitants in 2015.

Gallery

References

External links 

 
 

Populated places in Askeran Province
Populated places in Khojaly District